SS Vega was a Swedish barque, built in Bremerhaven, Germany in 1872. The Vega was the first ship to complete a voyage through the Northeast Passage, and the first vessel to circumnavigate the Eurasian continent, during the Vega expedition. Initially a troubled enterprise, the successful expedition is considered to be among the highest achievements in the history of Swedish science.

Construction
Though a sailing ship, the Vega had a 60 hp auxiliary steam engine. The hull was of wood measuring 150 ft. in length (45.72 m), a capacity of 357 DWT.

Arctic exploration
Constructed as a whaler, the vessel was acquired and rebuilt for Arctic exploration by Nils Adolf Erik Nordenskiöld with financial assistance from King Oscar II of Sweden and others. On 22 June 1878 the ship  set out from Karlskrona, Sweden through the Northeast Passage around the north coast of Eurasia.   Blocked by ice on 28 September of that year only 120 miles (200 km) short of the Bering Strait marking the eastern end of Asia, the ship was not freed until 18 July 1879.  Two days later East Cape was passed, and Vega became the first ship to complete a voyage through the Northeast Passage.  Returning by way of the Western Pacific, Indian Ocean, and Suez Canal, Vega also became the first vessel to circumnavigate the Eurasian continent.

Whaling and sealing
After the expedition Vega returned to her original trades of whaling and seal hunting. The ship was reported sunk in Melville Bay west of Greenland in 1903, sailing under the Scottish owner Ferguson of Dundee.

Images

See also 
 Gjøa, the first vessel to transit the Northwest Passage.
 Oscar Frithiof Nordquist, Finnish member of the expedition
 Cape Vega and Vegafonna, named after this ship

References

 Webpage about the journey
 Vegas färd kring Asien och Europa by A.E. Nordenskiöld 1880, slightly abbreviated version edited by Göran Schildt 1960.

External links

 Photograph by Alexander Wilson of "Vega" in Dundee Harbour, 1903, Dundee Central Library
 Expedition Vega 2013, ´s search expedition for the wreck of Vega in August 2013.

1872 ships
1900s in Greenland
Arctic exploration vessels
Barques
Maritime incidents in 1903
Sealing ships
Whaling ships
Ships built in Bremen (state)
Ships of Sweden
Shipwrecks in the Arctic Ocean
Steamships of Sweden
Exploration ships